Cape Emine is a headland located at the Bulgarian Black Sea Coast. It forms the tip of Stara Planina. Cape Emine is said to be Bulgaria's stormiest cape.

In the Middle Ages, there was a fortress called Emona on Cape Emine. Its name was derived from Aemon, the ancient name for Stara Planina. Nowadays, only some ruins of the fortress are left. There are also remnants of a monastery and a lighthouse. The village of Emona is located nearby.

Cape Emine is the endpoint of the European walking route E3 (its Bulgarian section is also known as "Kom–Emine").

Gallery

External links
 Cape Emona Gallery
 BulgarianLandmark.Info - Cape Emine

References

Emine
Bulgarian Black Sea Coast
Landforms of Burgas Province